Klemen Kosi (born 19 June 1991, in Maribor) is a World Cup alpine ski racer from Slovenia.

Career
Kosi made his World Cup debut March 2011 in Kranjska Gora, Slovenia. He participated at the 2013 World Ski Championships, where his best result was a 12th place in super combined. Kosi represented Slovenia at the 2014 Winter Olympics, where he reached 24th place in downhill.

External links

 

1991 births
Slovenian male alpine skiers
Alpine skiers at the 2014 Winter Olympics
Olympic alpine skiers of Slovenia
Sportspeople from Maribor
Living people
Alpine skiers at the 2018 Winter Olympics